Qeshlaq-e Yuzquyi (also Romanized as Qeshlāq-e Yūzqūyī; also known as Seyyedlar) is a village in Garamduz Rural District, Garamduz District, Khoda Afarin County, East Azerbaijan Province, Iran. At the 2006 census, its population was 66, in 13 families.

References 

Populated places in Khoda Afarin County